Grace Bannister  (née Johnson; 1924–1986) was a Unionist politician in Northern Ireland. She was the first female Lord Mayor of Belfast.

Early life and education
Bannister was born in the Ravenhill area of Belfast into a Protestant family, the second child of William H. Collim and Grace Johnston. She had an older sister and three younger brothers. Her grandfather owned a bakery, where her father worked. She was educated Roslyn Street primary school and Park Parade but left school at age 14 in order to work in the family shop. During the Second World War, she and her siblings were taken out of the city to Ballydrain after a landmine was discovered. To help the war effort, she went to work at Mackie's making parts for Stirling bombers.

In 1948, she married John Bannister. They had one daughter.

Career
Bannister was elected to Belfast Corporation in 1965, representing the Ulster Unionist Party (UUP).  She stood as an independent Unionist in Belfast South at the 1973 Northern Ireland Assembly election, after failing to secure an official party nomination.  She was not elected and continued to sit with the UUP group on the council.

Bannister served as Deputy Lord Mayor of Belfast in 1975–1976, and in 1979 was appointed High Sheriff of Belfast. In 1981 she was elected as the first female Lord Mayor of Belfast, beating Paddy Devlin and Stewart McCrea.

Honours
Bannister was awarded an OBE in the 1984 New Year Honours, for services to local
government in Northern Ireland.

References

Date of birth missing
1924 births
1986 deaths
High Sheriffs of Belfast
Lord Mayors of Belfast
Officers of the Order of the British Empire
Ulster Unionist Party councillors
Women mayors of places in Northern Ireland